Boyne Lake is an unincorporated community in northern Alberta in the County of St. Paul No. 19, located  north of Highway 36,  northeast of Edmonton.

The community was named in commemoration of the Battle of the Boyne.

References

Localities in the County of St. Paul No. 19